Zoo Idaho is a zoo in Pocatello, Idaho, that features animals native to the Intermountain West and has been open since 1932.

The zoo has more than 100 animals representing about 40 different species. "It is one of two zoos in the United States specializing in animals native to the Intermountain West." Zoo Idaho is the only zoo to incorporate the Shoshone-Bannock tribal culture into its program and design. The zoo itself sits on a natural landscape covering  in Ross Park. The cliff divides the zoo into two levels known as Upper and Lower Ross Park.

During the school year the zoo has established the Zoo Outreach Program, where employees bring a "piece of the zoo" into the classrooms of 3,000 school children each year. An additional 3,000 students visit the zoo on field trips in April and May alone. Zoo Idaho holds spring and summer programs and camps, which it holds in an outdoor classroom called the Tall Tales Tent.

Expansion plans
The zoo's 15-year plan estimates a cost of $15–$20 million. The total of Phase One will cost $2.5 million. 'Charlies' Place' will be a minimum of $1.9 million. The rest will go to the walkways, entrance, restrooms, gift shop, patio and a snack bar. Proceeds from the snack bar and gift shop will cover operation and maintenance costs associated with new and enhanced exhibits. The new Lynx exhibit is being funded by donations from the community.

References

External links

Zoos in Idaho
Pocatello, Idaho
Buildings and structures in Bannock County, Idaho
Tourist attractions in Bannock County, Idaho
1932 establishments in Idaho